Radha Gobinda Kar (Bengali: রাধাগোবিন্দ কর; 23 August 1852 – 19 December 1918) was an Indian Bengali physician and philanthropist.

Family
Radha Gobinda was born on 23 August 1852 at Santragachhi, West Bengal. His father, Durgadas Kar, was a physician.

Education
After passing the entrance examination from Hindu School, Radha Gobinda was admitted to Calcutta Medical College to study medicine, but left one year. In 1880, he was again admitted at the Calcutta Medical College (then under the University of Calcutta) where he studied for the next three years. He received his medical degree from the University of Edinburgh in 1883.

Calcutta Medical School

In order to provide a facility not associated with the British raj, Kar and numerous other doctors founded the Calcutta School of Medicine on 18 October 1886. The school changed its name to the Calcutta Medical School in August 1887, and it became The Calcutta Medical School and College of Physicians and Surgeons of Bengal after amalgamating with the College of Physicians and Surgeons of Bengal in 1904.

In 1916, it was renamed Belgachhia Medical College,.

In 1918, a society named as "Medical Education Society of Bengal" was formed for the better management of the Institution. Suresh Prasad Sarbadhikari  was the first President of the institution, and Kar was its first Secretary. On 12 May 1918, after the demise of Radha Gobinda Kar, the College was renamed as R. G. Kar Medical College and Hospital.

References

1850 births
1918 deaths
20th-century Indian medical doctors
University of Calcutta alumni
Alumni of the University of Edinburgh
19th-century Indian medical doctors
Scientists from West Bengal
People from Howrah district
Medical doctors from West Bengal
19th-century Indian philanthropists